Rubus sierrae is a small Mexican species of shrub in the genus Rubus, family Rosaceae. It is known from a single collection from near the village of Nabogame, Chihuahua, Mexico, in the Sierra Madre Occidental approximately 18 km northwest of Yepachic. The specimen was collected in riparian forest dominated by Acer grandidentatum Nutt. and Cupressus lusitanica.

Rubus sierrae has ternate leaves and solitary flowers. It is unusual in the genus in having distinctive serrate sepals. It is named in memory of Dionisia Sierra Cruz (1985–87), of Nabogame.

References

sierrae
Flora of Chihuahua (state)
Plants described in 1998